Dylan Baker (born October 7, 1959) is an American actor. He gained recognition for his roles in the films such as Planes, Trains and Automobiles (1987), Happiness (1998), Thirteen Days (2000), Road to Perdition (2002), Spider-Man 2 (2004) and Spider-Man 3 (2007) and on the television series Murder One (1995–1996) and The Good Wife, the latter of which earned him three Primetime Emmy Award nominations.

In 1991, Baker was nominated for a Tony Award and a Drama Desk Award for his performance in the original production of La Bête. In 2013, he made his directorial debut with the film 23 Blast.

Early life and education
Baker was born in Syracuse, New York, but was raised in Lynchburg, Virginia. He began his acting career as a teenager in regional theater productions. He attended Holy Cross Regional Catholic School, went on to attend Darlington School, and graduated from the Georgetown Preparatory School in 1976.

Baker attended the College of William and Mary in Virginia and later graduated from Southern Methodist University in 1980. Baker then received a Master's in Fine Arts from the Yale School of Drama, where he studied alongside Chris Noth and Patricia Clarkson.

Career
Baker's Broadway theatre credits include Eastern Standard, La Bête (for which he received a Tony Award nomination), Mauritius, and God of Carnage. He won an Obie Award in 1986 for his performance in the off-Broadway play Not About Heroes. The next year, he made his motion picture debut in the feature film Planes, Trains and Automobiles (1987).

Baker's first recurring TV role was on Steven Bochco's highly acclaimed Murder One (1995). Since then, he has appeared in such TV series as Northern Exposure, Law & Order, Law & Order: Criminal Intent, Without a Trace, CSI: Crime Scene Investigation, The West Wing, and the short-lived sitcom The Pitts.

He garnered major critical attention with his performance as a tormented pedophile in Todd Solondz's Happiness (1998). In 2000, he portrayed Secretary of Defense Robert McNamara in Thirteen Days, a historical drama about the Cuban Missile Crisis. He also held a small role in Requiem for a Dream, where he played a doctor who sees Jared Leto's character with a severely infected, rotting arm. In 2002 he portrayed Alexander Rance, an accountant for the Chicago Outfit, in Road to Perdition. He played Dr. Curt Connors in Spider-Man 2 (2004) and Spider-Man 3 (2007).

During the short-lived 2007 series Drive, Baker played the role of John Trimble, a father with a terminal illness. In 2009, Baker played William Cross in NBC's Kings, in which his wife Becky Ann Baker played Jessie Shepherd, the mother of protagonist David Shepherd. Baker also guest starred in an episode of Monk, playing a theater critic in "Mr. Monk and the Critic". Baker guest starred in the November 2010 House episode "A Pox on Our House". Baker guest starred in the season four finale of Burn Notice as Raines, an old spy friend of Michael's. He reprised the role in the season five premiere, and also permitted his likeness to be used in the Burn Notice graphic novel "A New Day". In 2010, Baker played Hollis B. Chenery in Secretariat.

Baker played Pashto-speaking CIA agent Jerry Boorman in season 4 of the TV series Damages. He guest-starred in "Upper West Side Story" (2012), an episode of the TV series White Collar. He had a recurring role as the father of Katharine McPhee's character Karen Cartwright on the NBC TV series Smash. He appeared in the USA Network miniseries Political Animals (2012).  For his performance as Colin Sweeney on The Good Wife, he was nominated for the Primetime Emmy Award for Outstanding Guest Actor in a Drama Series in 2010, 2012, and 2014.

Baker performed with Helen Mirren on Broadway in The Audience, a play that depicted meetings between Queen Elizabeth II and important historical figures. Baker played former Prime Minister John Major. The play opened on March 8, 2015.

In 2016, Baker had a memorable recurring role as deep-cover KGB agent William Crandall, a morally conflicted biological weapons expert, on Season 4 of FX series The Americans.

In September 2017, it was announced that Baker would be joining the cast of the Showtime drama Homeland for the show's 7th season, as Sen. Sam Paley, a 'maverick' who is leading an excessive investigation of the administration of new President Elizabeth Keane.

He starred in the 2020 series Hunters, in which his wife had a supporting role.

Audiobooks
Baker is a prolific narrator of audiobooks, having narrated a wide range of books, from fiction (The Grapes of Wrath, The Corrections) to biographies (Steve Jobs) to Argo.

He garnered the 2002 Audie Award for Abridged Fiction for his reading of The Corrections by Jonathan Franzen. Baker has also recorded Franzen's 2015 novel, Purity.

Personal life
In 1990, he married actress Becky Gelke, now known professionally as Becky Ann Baker. They have a daughter and reside in New York City.

On September 1, 2015, Baker tried to save the life of his neighbor, Broadway and movie actress and dancer Vivien Eng, in the high-rise where he lives in New York City when her apartment caught fire, but was driven back by smoke and fire. Firefighters eventually got the seriously injured woman out of the apartment and rushed her to the hospital. However, her injuries were too severe and she died two days later.

Filmography

Film

Television

References

External links

 
 
 

1959 births
Male actors from New York (state)
American male film actors
American male television actors
American male musical theatre actors
College of William & Mary alumni
Living people
People from Lynchburg, Virginia
Male actors from Syracuse, New York
Southern Methodist University alumni
Yale School of Drama alumni
20th-century American male actors
21st-century American male actors
People from Syracuse, New York
Male actors from Virginia
Georgetown Preparatory School alumni
Darlington School alumni